Henriëtte Hilda Bosmans (6 December 1895 – 2 July 1952) was a Dutch composer and pianist.

Early life and education 
Her father died when she was six months old. She studied piano with her mother and composition with Jan Willem Kersbergen, Cornelis Dopper and Willem Pijper. She became a piano teacher herself at the age of 17.

Career 
Bosmans debuted as a concert pianist in 1915 in Utrecht. She performed throughout Europe with among others Pierre Monteux, Willem Mengelberg and Ernest Ansermet. She gave 22 concerts with the Concertgebouw Orchestra alone between 1929 and 1949. She played one of her own compositions at a concert in Geneva in 1929. In 1940, one of her compositions was performed in concert by the Cincinnati Symphony Orchestra, with Ruth Posselt as the soloist. In 1941, Posselt again performed work by Bosmans, with the Boston Symphony Orchestra.

Because her mother was Jewish, Bosmans was under the scrutiny of authorities during the German occupation, and by 1942 she could no longer perform on public stages in the Netherlands. Her aged mother was arrested and deported, but Bosmans and others intervened to rescue her from further detention. Unable to work as a musician, and needing to care for her mother through wartime famine and other dangers, Bosmans focused again on composing. One of her songs "became an anthem of liberation" as the war ended, and Allied soldiers arrived in the Netherlands.

After the war, Bosmans published her compositions. She wrote a series of songs for her close friend, French mezzo-soprano Noémie Pérugia, between 1949 and 1952. She was knighted in 1951, a member of the Royal Order of Orange-Nassau.

Personal life and legacy 

Bosmans had relationships with both men and women, with whom she often also collaborated musically. She was partnered from 1920–1927 to the Dutch cellist and conductor Frieda Belinfante, a prominent lesbian and member of the Dutch Resistance during World War II, who in 1923 premiered Bosmans' Second Cello Concerto. She was later engaged, briefly, to the violinist Francis Koene, who died from a brain tumor in 1934, before they could be married.  Bosmans died from stomach cancer in 1952, aged 56 years, in Amsterdam. Her grave is in the city's Zorgvlied cemetery.

The Henriëtte Bosmans Prize, named after Bosmans, is an encouragement prize for young Dutch composers. The prize, consisting of €2500 (US$3500) and a performance, has been awarded since 1994 by the Society of Dutch Composers. In 2017, Dutch-Canadian singer Pauline van der Roest gave a concert of works by Bosmans, in Ottawa. In 2020, North American musicians Leah Plave and Dan Sato made a new recording of the complete works of Bosmans for cello and piano.

Selected works 
 Six Preludes for piano solo (1917–1918)
 Sonata for violoncello-piano (1919)
 Concert Piece for violin and orchestra (1935)

References

External links

 Biography

1895 births
1952 deaths
Dutch classical pianists
Dutch women pianists
Dutch women classical composers
Dutch classical composers
Jewish Dutch musicians
Jewish classical composers
Musicians from Amsterdam
Bisexual musicians
LGBT classical composers
Dutch LGBT musicians
Bisexual Jews
LGBT classical musicians
20th-century classical composers
20th-century classical pianists
Deaths from cancer in the Netherlands
Deaths from stomach cancer
20th-century women composers
20th-century Dutch LGBT people
19th-century Dutch LGBT people
20th-century women pianists